A double concerto is a concerto featuring two performers, or the use of a double orchestral body where the work is in concerto grosso form.

Double Concerto may also refer to:
 Double Concerto (Abrahamsen)
 Double Concerto (Bach)
 Double Concerto (Balada)
 Double Concerto (Brahms)
 Double Concerto (Bruch)
 Double Concerto (Carter)
 Double Concerto (Delius)
 Double Concerto (Harbison)
 Double Concerto (Harrison)
 Double Concerto (Henze)
 Double Concerto (Lutosławski)
 Double Concerto (Previn)
 Double Concerto (Rorem)